Östen Sjöstrand (16 June 1925, Gothenburg – 13 May 2006) was a Swedish poet, writer and translator. He became a member of the Swedish Academy in 1975.

Biography
Östen Sjöstrand gave his introductory speech in the Swedish Academy about the Swedish writer Pär Lagerkvist, who preceded him at the same chair. As a poet he debuted in 1949 with Unio, which was marked by the post-war agony of the Swedish 1940s poetry. He was above all inspired of French poetry. Music was another source of inspiration for Östen Sjöstrand. In cooperation with Sven-Erik Bäck he wrote a pair of operas, including Gästabudet.

Bibliography
Unio (1949)
Invigelse (1950)
Återvändo (1953)
Ande och verklighet (1954)
Dikter mellan midnatt och gryning (1954)
Främmande mörker, främmande ljus (1955)
Dikter 1949–1955 (1958)
Hemlöshet och hem (1958)
Världen skapas varje dag (1960)
De gåtfulla hindren och andra dikter (1961)
En vinter i Norden (1963)
I vattumannens tecken (1967)
Ensamma stjärnor, en gemensam horisont (1970)
Drömmen är ingen fasad (1971)
Fantasins nödvändighet (1971)
Pär Lagerkvist (1975)
Strömöverföring (1977)
Dikter (1981)
Strax ovanför vattenlinjen (1984)
På återvägen från Jasna Góra (1987)
Sprickorna i stenen (1994)

References

Further reading
 

Swedish poets
Swedish translators
1925 births
2006 deaths
Swedish male poets
20th-century Swedish poets
20th-century translators
20th-century Swedish male writers
Members of the Swedish Academy